The Battle of Driefontein on 10 March 1900 followed on the Battle of Poplar Grove in the Second Boer War between the British Empire and the Boer republics, in what is now South Africa. In the first half of 1900, the British made an offensive towards the two Boer republic capitals of Bloemfontein and Pretoria. The Boer forces under the command of Christiaan de Wet were holding a  line covering the approach to Bloemfontein. Lord Roberts subsequently ordered a division under Lieutenant General Thomas Kelly-Kenny to attack the position from the front, while Lieutenant General Charles Tucker's division moved against its left flank. The Boers were subsequently forced to withdraw losing 124 men killed and captured, while the British lost 82 killed and 342 wounded.

References

Conflicts in 1900
1900 in South Africa
Battles of the Second Boer War
Battles involving the United Kingdom
March 1900 events